Deh-e Abdollah (also Romanized as Deh-e ʿAbdollah and Dehabdollah) is a village in Kavirat Rural District, Chatrud District, Kerman County, Kerman Province, Iran. At the 2006 census, its population was 28, in 9 families.

References 

Populated places in Kerman County